The 2021–22 UNLV Runnin' Rebels basketball team represented the University of Nevada, Las Vegas during the 2021–22 NCAA Division I men's basketball season. The Runnin' Rebels were led by first-year head coach Kevin Kruger and played their home games at the Thomas & Mack Center in Paradise, Nevada as members of the Mountain West Conference. They finished the season 18–14, 10–8 in MWC play to finish in fifth place. They lost to Wyoming in the quarterfinals of the MWC tournament. They failed to receive an invite to a postseason tournament.

Previous season
In a season limited due to the ongoing COVID-19 pandemic, the Runnin' Rebels finished the 2020–21 season 12–15, 12–6 in Mountain West play to finish in seventh place. They defeated Air Force in the first round of the Mountain West tournament before losing in the quarterfinals to Utah State.

On March 18, 2021, head coach T. J. Otzelberger left UNLV after two seasons for the Iowa State head coaching job. On March 21, the school announced that assistant coach Kevin Kruger would be promoted to the head coaching position.

Offseason

Departures

Incoming transfers

2021 recruiting class

Roster

Schedule and results

|-
!colspan=9 style=| Non-conference regular season

|-
!colspan=9 style=| Mountain West regular season

|-
!colspan=9 style=| Mountain West tournament

Source

References

UNLV
UNLV Runnin' Rebels basketball seasons
Run
Run